Clay County USD 379 is a public unified school district headquartered in Clay Center, Kansas, United States.  The district includes the communities of Clay Center, Green, Longford, Morganville, Oak Hill, Wakefield, Idana, Ladysmith, and nearby rural areas.

Schools
The school district operates the following schools:
 Clay Center Community High School
 Clay Center Community Middle School
 Garfield Elementary School
 Lincoln Elementary School
 Wakefield K-12 School

See also
 Kansas State Department of Education
 Kansas State High School Activities Association
 List of high schools in Kansas
 List of unified school districts in Kansas

References

External links
 

School districts in Kansas